Gamma Chamaeleontis, Latinized from γ Chamaeleontis, is a solitary star located in the southern circumpolar constellation of Chamaeleon. It can faintly be seen with the naked eye on a dark night, having an apparent visual magnitude of 4.12. Based upon an annual parallax shift of 7.81 mas, it is located around 418 light years from the Sun.

This is an evolved K-type giant star with a stellar classification of K5 III. At the estimated distance of the star, this yields a physical size of about 67 times the radius of the Sun. It is a suspected variable star, with an amplitude of 0.01 magnitude. The star radiates 864 times the solar luminosity from its outer atmosphere with an effective temperature of 4,053 K.

References

Chamaeleontis, Gamma
Chamaeleon (constellation)
Chamaeleontis, Gamma
Durchmusterung objects
092305
051839
04174